The Irwin Conference Center (formerly known as Irwin Union Bank) was designed by Eero Saarinen and built in 1954 in Columbus, Indiana.  It is currently owned and operated by Cummins, whose world headquarters is located across Jackson Street in the Cummins Corporate Office Building. In recognition of its unique and beautiful design, the resource was designated a National Historic Landmark by the National Park Service in 2001.

The building consists of a one-story bank structure and adjacent three-story office annex.  A portion of the office annex was built along with the banking hall in 1954.  The remaining, much larger portion, designed by Kevin Roche, John Dinkeloo and Associates, was built in 1973.

History
Irwin Miller became president of the Irwin Union Trust Company after his father's death in 1947. Three years later, he commissioned Eero Saarinen to design a new building for the bank. The building was designed to distance the Irwin Union Bank from traditional banking architecture, which mostly echoed imposing, neoclassical style buildings of brick or stone. Miller wanted the building to symbolize the bank's progressive mission, which included offering some of the first credit cards and earliest drive-through banking. Instead of having tellers behind iron bars and removed from their customers, Saarinen worked to develop a building that would welcome customers rather than intimidate them.

The structure has changed ownership twice since 2008 and is now operated by the corporate hospitality division of Cummins.

Design
The glass building may look simple, but like all Saarinen's projects, every aspect of the space was designed after extensive research of its use. A freestanding structure for files occupies the center in the building, so that the office floor would be open and uncluttered. The colorful counters where tellers worked were equipped with removable plastic hoods when traffic demanded additional counters. A small elevator and spiral staircase gave tellers secure access to the cash vault below and two steel and glass vestibules connect the glass pavilion to the three-story office annex, where customers could transact business privately.

The grid of large domes on the roof of the bank was a source of amusement for the townspeople, who jokingly called the bank a "brassiere factory". Nevertheless, they loved the building and customers increased fourfold.

Landscape 
The bank building only occupied one-third of the site, the rear portion housed a drive-through window and large parking lot surrounded and intersected with trees. Landscape architect Dan Kiley chose specific types of trees and foliage in order to integrate the bank with its neighboring buildings and help shade the inside of the bank. He used littleleaf linden trees as the basis of the space, with euonymus as ground cover and seasonal spring bulbs, begonias, geraniums, and chrysanthemums as accents.

The goal was to create a green space in the middle of downtown Columbus and provide the city with some breathing room. Since the bank building is lower than the surrounding buildings, its landscape feels more park-like. As the number of automobiles on the streets grew in the early 1950s, spaces like this helped relieve the congestion of busy downtown areas.

Bank closure 
On September 18, 2009, the Indiana Department of Financial Institutions closed the Irwin Union Bank and Trust Company and named the Federal Deposit Insurance Corporation (FDIC) as receiver.  First Financial Bank of Hamilton, Ohio, purchased all deposits and virtually all assets of Irwin Union Bank and participated in a loss-share transaction jointly with the FDIC. The FDIC estimated that the cost to the Deposit Insurance Fund (DIF) for both institutions was $850 million.

Cummins ownership 
In 2010, Cummins purchased the building from First Financial and announced its intention to remodel the bank and associated buildings at a cost of $5.25 million.  First Financial would continue to occupy the building until its new facility is completed in 2012.  Cummins then expects to complete renovations by summer 2014.  The Saarinen-designed structure will be used for a corporate conference center and meeting space.

References

External links

 Irwin Union Bank History
 Link to National Register of Historic Places - National Register of Historical Places - INDIANA (IN), Bartholomew County

Commercial buildings on the National Register of Historic Places in Indiana
Commercial buildings completed in 1954
Bank buildings in Indiana
Columbus, Indiana
National Historic Landmarks in Indiana
Buildings and structures in Bartholomew County, Indiana
Modernist architecture in Indiana
Eero Saarinen structures
National Historic Landmarks in Columbus, Indiana
Tourist attractions in Bartholomew County, Indiana
National Register of Historic Places in Bartholomew County, Indiana
1954 establishments in Indiana